Blerim Džemaili (born 12 April 1986) is a Swiss professional footballer who plays for Super League club Zürich as a midfielder.

He began his career at FC Zürich, where he won the Swiss Super League twice. He subsequently spent most of his career in Italy, making 280 Serie A appearances for Torino, Parma, Napoli, Genoa and Bologna.

Džemaili made his debut for the Switzerland national team in March 2006 and went on to make over 65 appearances. He was selected for their squads at the FIFA World Cup in 2006, 2014 and 2018, as well as UEFA Euro 2016.

Childhood and early career
Džemaili was born to Fekredin and Shemije Džemaili, an Albanian family from Bogovinje, in SFR Yugoslavia (now North Macedonia). At age four, he and his family migrated to Zürich, Switzerland. At age nine, he joined youth club Oerlikon Zürich for one year before moving to FC Unterstrass. At age 14, Blerim moved to third league team YF Juventus as a youth player before moving to FC Zürich in 2001. While with Zürich, Džemaili rose through the ranks and made the senior team at age 17.

In 2021, he revealed that he has been a fan of A.C. Milan since childhood.

Club career

Zürich
Džemaili began his senior career with Zürich. In his first season, he made 30 appearances for the club, scoring twice and creating three assists. Džemaili played either as a central or defensive midfielder. In the 2004–05 season, he helped the club win the Swiss Cup. Džemaili imposed a strong influence on the field as he possessed accurate passing capabilities as well as a fast and aggressive approach to the game. This led Džemaili to taking the role of captain during the 2005–06. Džemaili was 19 when he was chosen captain and is one of the youngest captains in Swiss football history. Džemaili led his team to glory as Zürich won the Swiss Super League in the 2005–06 and 2006–07 seasons.

After winning the Swiss cup and league, Džemaili moved to Premier League side Bolton Wanderers.

Bolton Wanderers
Džemaili signed a preliminary contract agreement with Bolton on 9 February 2007, meaning that he would sign for the Premier League outfit once his contract expired in the summer of 2007.

Former Bolton manager Sam Allardyce was quoted as saying, "Blerim is a fantastic player, who has played for the best team in Switzerland for the past three years. For someone so young, he has a wealth of experience. At the age of 20, he is the skipper of FC Zürich and is expected to become a regular international for Switzerland in the years ahead. He has hardly missed a game for FC Zurich since he started playing for them at the age of 17. I am excited by the prospect of working with Blerim next season." Džemaili, however, sustained a rupturing cruciate knee ligaments and was out for six months. He made his debut as a substitute in the club's FA Cup defeat to Sheffield United in what proved to be his only showing of the 2007–08 campaign. He later insisted that he would not change anything about his time at Bolton following his season-long loan move to Torino.

Torino and Parma
Džemaili joined Torino on a season-long loan deal, with an option to purchase outright, on 1 September 2008, making his debut with Torino on 24 September 2008, and became a staple fixture in their side for the season. In April 2009, Torino signed him outright from Bolton for €2 million. Torino announced that deal after their relegation to Serie B in June.

After having played just once for Torino at Coppa Italia, Džemaili completed a loan move to Parma on 31 August 2009, with an option to sign the 50% registration rights of the player at the end of season. In exchange, Daniele Vantaggiato moved to Turin on loan. first and second halves of Džemaili's registration rights were then bought by Parma in the summers of 2010 and 2011 for a total fee of €7 million.

Napoli
On 25 June 2011, Džemaili was signed by Napoli for €9 million with Fabiano Santacroce (loan) and Manuele Blasi (free) going the other way to Parma. Džemaili has been a consistent performer so far for Napoli. Džemaili has been well received by the fans as he has scored twice and assisted once in eleven appearances in the Serie A. His first was a right-footed shot from outside the box to the bottom left corner following a corner in a match against Lecce and his second was struck late to earn an equaliser as Napoli earned a point at Novara. Džemaili has also appeared six times in the UEFA Champions League group stages and helped Napoli into the final 16. At the end of his first season with Napoli, Dzemaili has made 28 appearances in the Serie A, scoring three times and providing four assists. On 25 March 2012, he scored a notable long distance goal against Catania.

Džemaili had appeared regularly for the side in the Coppa Italia, and played the entire match in the final in which they defeated Juventus 2–0.

On 30 March 2013, he scored a hat-trick described by Goal.com as "spectacular", in a 5–3 win away at Torino. He netted the second goal in a 2–0 win against Genoa just a week later, making it four goals in two games. He also scored Napoli's third goal in a 3–0 win against Pescara on 27 April.

Džemaili was an unused substitute as Napoli won the 2014 Coppa Italia Final 3–1 against Fiorentina.

Galatasaray

On 1 September 2014, Džemaili signed a three-year contract with Turkish Süper Lig team Galatasaray for a €2.35 million transfer fee. He signed a three-year contract, worth €2.4 million, €2.1 million and €2.1 million respectively.

On 30 August 2015, Džemaili returned to Serie A to join Genoa on loan from Galatasaray. Galatasaray also bore €1.3 million of Džemaili's €2.1 million salary. On 27 September, Džemaili scored his first goal for the club with a direct free-kick that took a deflection off Giacomo Bonaventura. This was the lone goal in a 1–0 win over Milan. On 18 October, Džemaili received his first red card for the club, after getting two yellows (47th and 55th minute) in a 3–2 win over Chievo.

Bologna
On 17 August 2016, Džemaili returned to Italy again for Bologna, who paid Galatasaray a €1.3 million transfer fee. He was booked in matchday 33 on 22 April, missing the match on 30 April with the club mathematically avoiding the relegation by having 13 more points than Crotone with four matches remaining. Džemaili would join his new club Montreal Impact before the end of the Serie A season (and after Bologna secured the place of next season), making their 3–2 loss against Atalanta his last match.

Montreal Impact (loan)
On 9 December 2016, Montreal Impact president and Bologna chairman Joey Saputo announced that Džemaili would join the Major League Soccer (MLS) team on loan in the spring of 2017 as a Designated Player. On 9 May 2017, the loan was officially announced. On 19 January 2018, the Impact terminated the loan and Džemaili returned to Bologna. He had seven goals and 10 assists in 22 games for Montreal.

Shenzhen
On 31 January 2020, he transferred to Chinese club Shenzhen.

Zürich
In December 2020 Džemaili returned after 13 years to his youth club Zürich. He signed a contract for one and a half seasons.

International career

Džemaili made his debut for the Switzerland national team in a friendly match against Scotland on 1 March 2006. He was a member of the Swiss squad at the 2006 FIFA World Cup without making an appearance.

On 6 September 2013, Džemaili scored his first international goal from a penalty kick in a 4–4 home draw in a World Cup qualifier against Iceland.

On 2 June 2014, Džemaili was named in Switzerland's 2014 World Cup squad by national coach Ottmar Hitzfeld. In the team's second match, against France, Džemaili came on at half-time for Valon Behrami and on the 81st minute, Džemaili fired a long-range, low free-kick which went through the three-man wall and beat France goalkeeper Hugo Lloris. He scored the first direct free-kick of the tournament in a 5–2 loss to France.

Džemaili scored his third international goal against San Marino on 10 October 2014 in UEFA Euro 2016 qualifying, heading-in Ricardo Rodríguez's corner to give the Swiss a 3–0 lead in an eventual 4–0 victory.

Džemaili scored twice for Switzerland on 10 June 2015, the second of which came from a direct free-kick in a 3–0 friendly victory over Liechtenstein at Stockhorn Arena in Thun.

Džemaili was part of the squad in Euro 2016 and 2018 World Cup qualification. He was included in the Switzerland national football team 23 man squad for the 2018 FIFA World Cup.

Style of play
During his time in Serie A, Džemaili differed from most other players in the attacking midfield position due to his box-to-box approach to the role and hard-running style. Indeed, although he is effective as a ball-winner in front of the back-line who breaks down opposing plays, he is also capable of contributing to his team's offensive plays with goals and assists in a more advanced role, courtesy of his vision and eye for goal from midfield. He is also good at timing his runs, finding space, and getting into the box unmarked by making late attacking runs into the area from behind, and is a powerful and accurate striker of the ball from both inside and outside the area, which allows him to play as a mezzala; he is also an effective penalty taker. Otherwise, Džemaili is tidy in possession and also has great passing range, usually completing around 90% of passes per game; moreover, he is known for his ability to switch the play with long balls. A versatile, consistent, tenacious, and tactically intelligent right-footed player, he is capable of playing in several midfield roles, and can adapt to various systems; aside from his usual offensive and holding midfield roles, he has also been used as a central midfielder in either a two or three-man midfield, as a deep-lying playmaker, or even as a winger. In addition to his playing ability, he is also highly regarded for his leadership.

Personal life
In 2015, Džemaili married Shkoder-born Albanian model Erjona Sulejmani who, in the same year, gave birth to their eldest son, Luan. By January 2018, they were divorced.

Career statistics

Club

International

Scores and results list Switzerland's goal tally first, score column indicates score after each Džemaili goal.

Honours
Zürich
Swiss Super League: 2005–06, 2006–07
Swiss Cup: 2004–05

Napoli
Coppa Italia: 2011–12, 2013–14

Galatasaray
Süper Lig: 2014–15
Turkish Cup: 2014–15

References
Notes

Citations

External links

FC Zürich stats 

1986 births
Living people
Yugoslav emigrants to Switzerland
Swiss people of Albanian descent
Swiss people of Macedonian descent
Sportspeople from Tetovo
Swiss men's footballers
Association football midfielders
Albanian footballers from North Macedonia
Switzerland youth international footballers
Switzerland under-21 international footballers
Switzerland international footballers
2006 FIFA World Cup players
2014 FIFA World Cup players
UEFA Euro 2016 players
2018 FIFA World Cup players
SC Young Fellows Juventus players
FC Zürich players
Bolton Wanderers F.C. players
Torino F.C. players
Parma Calcio 1913 players
S.S.C. Napoli players
Galatasaray S.K. footballers
Genoa C.F.C. players
Bologna F.C. 1909 players
CF Montréal players
Shenzhen F.C. players
Swiss Super League players
Serie A players
Süper Lig players
Major League Soccer players
Designated Players (MLS)
China League One players
Expatriate footballers in Italy
Expatriate footballers in England
Expatriate footballers in Turkey
Expatriate soccer players in Canada
Expatriate footballers in China
Swiss expatriate footballers
Swiss expatriate sportspeople in Italy
Swiss expatriate sportspeople in Canada
Swiss expatriate sportspeople in England
Swiss expatriate sportspeople in Turkey